The Municipality of Ormož is a municipality in the traditional region of Styria in northeastern Slovenia. The seat of the municipality is the town of Ormož. Ormož became a municipality in 1994.

Geography

Settlements
In addition to the municipal seat of Ormož, the municipality also includes the following settlements:

 Bresnica
 Cerovec Stanka Vraza
 Cvetkovci
 Dobrava
 Dobrovščak
 Drakšl
 Frankovci
 Gomila pri Kogu
 Hajndl
 Hardek
 Hermanci
 Hujbar
 Hum pri Ormožu
 Ivanjkovci
 Jastrebci
 Kajžar
 Kog
 Krčevina
 Lačaves
 Lahonci
 Lešnica
 Lešniški Vrh
 Libanja
 Litmerk
 Loperšice
 Lunovec
 Mali Brebrovnik
 Mihalovci
 Mihovci pri Veliki Nedelji
 Miklavž pri Ormožu
 Osluševci
 Pavlovci
 Pavlovski Vrh
 Podgorci
 Preclava
 Pušenci
 Ritmerk
 Runeč
 Šardinje
 Senešci
 Sodinci
 Spodnji Ključarovci
 Stanovno
 Strezetina
 Strjanci
 Strmec pri Ormožu
 Svetinje
 Trgovišče
 Trstenik
 Veličane
 Velika Nedelja
 Veliki Brebrovnik
 Vičanci
 Vinski Vrh
 Vitan
 Vodranci
 Vuzmetinci
 Zasavci
 Žerovinci
 Žvab

References

External links

Municipality of Ormož on Geopedia
Municipality of Ormož website

Ormož
1994 establishments in Slovenia